Joseph Fernandez may refer to:

 Joe Fernandez (businessman) (born 1977), founder of Klout
 Joseph A. Fernandez, Chancellor, NYC Department of Education, 1990–1993
 Joseph F. Fernandez (born 1937), CIA operative and figure in the Iran-Contra Affair
 Joseph Gabriel Fernandez (1925–2023), bishop of Quilon
 Joseph Fernandez, one of the Vietnamese Martyrs